Paolo Violi (6 February 1931 – 22 January 1978) was an Italian-Canadian mobster and capodecina in the Cotroni crime family of Montreal.

Violi was born in Sinopoli, Calabria, Italy, in 1931; his father Domenico was the boss of the Violi clan in his hometown. Violi immigrated to Southern Ontario in 1951. He married Grazia Luppino, daughter of the boss of the Luppino crime family in Hamilton. He later moved to Montreal where he became associated with in the Calabrese compatriot Cotroni crime family, which had most of the control in Montreal. In the late 1970s, boss Vincenzo Cotroni transferred the day-to-day activities of the family to Violi, and a mob war soon broke out between the Calabrians and the Sicilian faction led by Nicolò Rizzuto. The war resulted in the murder of Violi on 22 January 1978, as well as his brothers, as the Sicilian Rizzuto crime family emerged as the preeminent crime family in Montreal by the early 1980s. After Violi's death, his widow and two sons, Domenico and Giuseppe moved to Hamilton; the Violi brothers became affiliated with the Luppino crime family, later also becoming known as the Luppino-Violi crime family.

Early career

Violi was born in Sinopoli, Calabria on 6 February 1931. He was born into the mob; his father Domenico Violi was the head of the 'Ndrangheta Violi clan in Sinopoli. Violi later immigrated to Southern Ontario in 1951. On 24 May 1955, he fatally shot Natale Brigante in Toronto, sustaining a stab wound from Brigante. He was charged with manslaughter in a Welland court, but was acquitted claiming it was self-defense, showing the stab wound as evidence. Violi testified at his trial that both he and Brigante were pimps and the dispute that led to the killing was about the control of a prostitute. However, it is believed that Brigante was murdered as part of a bloodfeud, with one policeman saying, "I'm sure [Violi] was told 'Take care of this problem for us'. Otherwise he never would have shot up [in status] the way he did."

Violi gained Canadian citizenship in 1956, and by the early 1960s was running illegally manufactured liquor from Ontario to Quebec. He became associated with Giacomo Luppino, boss of the Luppino crime family in Hamilton, but left for Montreal in 1963 on Luppino's orders to avoid clashes with other Hamilton mobster, Johnny Papalia. On 10 July 1965, Violi married Grazia Luppino, the daughter of Giacomo, in Hamilton with Vincenzo Cotroni, boss of the Cotroni crime family, serving as the best man at the wedding.

In Quebec, Violi opened the Reggio Bar in Saint-Leonard in the mid 1960s, which he used as a base for extortion. In the 1960s and 1970s, Cotroni used associate William "Obie" Obront to supervise a bookmaking network in the Ottawa-Hull area that handled around $50,000 in bets per day, with 25 percent going to Violi. Obie also served as Cotroni's chief banker and financial adviser, responsible for laundering money. For Montreal's Expo 67, Obront also helped the Cotronis land the meat and vending machine supply contract—most of which was tainted meat.

Violi saw himself as the future boss of the Cotroni family and in private he mocked Cotroni as a weak leader. Violi told Luppino in a phone conversation that he policed listened into, "I already know that Cotroni is weak...I told him, Compare ["Godfather"], I am with you 100 percent, but only if you are sincere. Otherwise, I won't be 100 percent with you." In another wire-tapped phone conversation with Luppino, Violi berated Bill Bonanno, the son of Joseph Bonanno, as he stated, "I told you that if I was to know that Bonanno was coming up again, I would tell him what a dishonest man he is. I would have gone myself and shown him what I thought of him...I would have told him, 'I'm not with you nor with him. I'm by myself. I don't want to have anything to do with anyone, because you're all a bunch of bastards'. The way things stand today that the abboccatoes [regions] will split and everyone will be on their own. I'm telling you that, in Montreal, we will be alone by ourselves." Violi's brash, cocky and arrogant approach and lack of respect for his elders did not make him friends in the underworld.

Underboss
In the early 1970s, Cotroni transferred the day-to-day activities of the family to his Calabrian compatriot Violi, a capodecina together with Nicolas Di Iorio, Frank Cotroni and Luigi Greco. Cotroni's role became more that of an adviser to the younger Calabrian. Greco led the Sicilian faction of the family until his death in 1972.

In December 1970, his bar was bugged with wiretaps by Robert Menard, an undercover police officer who rented an apartment above Violi's Reggio Bar for several years, which were later used in subsequent cases. Menard, who used the alias Robert Wilson, was supposed to go undercover for three months, but instead served undercover for about five years and paid $125 per month for a small apartment just above the Reggio Bar. 

Menard under his Wilson identity hardly spoke at all to Violi during his first two years as his tenant and was most surprised when Violi wanted to speak over a meal of pizza and wine. Menard described Violi as a "better class of criminals." Menard stated that Violi's eyes had "intelligence, but ruthlessness. Total ruthlessness. Paolo would kill, but he'd do it in a much more intelligent way...You want to know the difference? They [French-Canadian bank robbers] will kill you indiscriminately, for no reason, while Paolo would kill you if he had to for power and for position and for advantage. That's the difference...They'll [French-Canadian bank robbers] kill because they don't like you having a toothpick in your mouth. That's the difference here. Goddamn animals. Nothing else...Paolo will use killing as a means to an end, a method. If you kill someone that you're trying to gather money from-unless you want to use him as an example-what the hell's the use use of killing a source of revenue?...That's not businesslike. Real smart guys don't kill until it absolutely has to be done."

Menard usually talked with Violi every Saturday morning over numerous cups of coffee. Menard learned that he was a staunch federalist who detested Quebec separatism. Riots had erupted in September 1969 when the Saint-Leonard school board changed the language of instruction for Italian Canadian children from English to French. Several Italian Canadian school teachers who continued to teach in English received death threats, and Violi told Menard that he provided bodyguards to the teachers. Menard recalled, "God, he hated the PQ party! I think he hated them more than the cops. He just hated them! He thought they were destroying Canada...He was very nationalistic. He spoke English a lot." Menard had once gone undercover to infiltrate a FLQ cell in the 1960s, and found himself being subjected to numerous political Marxist discussion meetings alongside readings of the poems by Charles Baudelaire, whose poetry the FLQ adored, but which Menard hated.

Menard recalled that Violi was the neighbourhood leader in Saint-Leonard as he recalled, "There was some fear. He was like the don. He was like the godfather. I can remember some old people going over and kissing his hand...I guess it was a mark of respect. He was always bowed to. I'm not saying it was grandiose. It was little things." Violi received a steady steam of visitors at the Reggio Bar, mostly from New York and Hamilton. Menard stated, "There would always be some big cars from the States and there would always be somebody there. All the time. It was like a parade. It was like a doctor's office with patients. You know, he'd be receiving in the afternoons. A car from New York. A car from New Jersey. A car from Ontario. God, all kinds of big, huge cars. They'd be parked. The guys would come in. Sometimes he'd greet them at the door. And they'd be on their way after a bit." Violi played the role of a community leader within the Italian Canadian community in Montreal, serving as a banker, judge and community mediator. He was known for providing free ice cream to children at the Reggio Bar, and he would never permit anyone to swear in front of children. However, his apparent generosity was self-interested as any favour he provided such as a loan or resolving a business dispute came with the understanding that he was entitled to favours in return. Menard discovered, much to his shock, that after the owner of a pizzeria saw him talking with Violi in the street, he had refused to charge him for the pizza he just ordered, saying that any friend of Violi's was entitled to permanent free pizza from his pizzeria.

On 10 July 1973, the Popeyes Motorcycle Club, killed Mario Ciambrone and Salvatore Sergi of the Cotroni family for selling them low quality heroin at a premium price. On 31 July 1973, Violi met with Frank Cotroni who called the Popeyes "crazy, crazy, crazy...They've killed something like ten guys already!" It was agreed that Frank should handle the bikers while Violi would handle Angelo Faquino, the intermediary drug dealer. On 2 September 1973, Faquino was killed while walking down the street. Much to Violi's disgust, Frank spent too much time planning out an attack on the bikers as he was very concerned about the possibility of innocent by-standers being killed and never actually carried out the assignment. In a conversation recorded by a police wiretap, Violi was heard saying, "He [Frank] should have gone into the club, clients or no clients, lined everybody up against the wall and rat-a-tat-tat." On 14 September 1973, a Cotroni family piciotto, Toni Di Genova, was killed by the Popeyes, which led to calls within the family to "take care of the Frenchmen once and for all." At a meeting at the Windsor Hotel attended by Violi, Vic Cotorni and Joe DiMaulo, it was decided to end the war with the Popeyes, which was felt to be adverse for business. Even though it was Violi who decided to end the war, he continued to lash out at Frank Cotroni, whom he felt should had massacred the Popeyes. 

When Menard would see his family on occasional weekends, he had to go early in the morning to avoid Violi's guards who were always on the look-out for anything suspicious. In the winter, Menard would place snow on the hood and roof of his car when he returned to make it appear that his car had never left as he noted that Violi's guards would always check in the morning if the snow was atop of the tenants' automobiles and would want to know where the tenant was that night if there was no snow atop the car. Violi once inspected Menard's car for the police identification number that all cars belonging to the Service de police de la Ville de Montréal are required to have, but in this case, the number had been filed away. As part of the Wilson identity, Menard was billed as an electrician, which led Violi to ask him to fix a broken lightbulb. When "Robert Wilson" was revealed to be the undercover policeman Robert Menard, Violi expressed his respect for his skill as a policeman, telling his crew, "He's a stand-up guy. He's a better fucking soldier than the rest of you."

As tension then grew into a power struggle between the Calabrian and Sicilian factions of the family, a mob war began in 1973. During a time of power struggle between the Sicilian and Calabrian factions of the Cotroni crime family, Violi complained about the independent modus operandi of his Sicilian 'underlings', Nicolò Rizzuto in particular. "He is going from one side to the other, here and there, and he says nothing to nobody, he is doing business and nobody knows anything," Violi said about Rizzuto. Violi asked for more 'soldiers' from his Bonanno bosses, clearly preparing for war, and Violi's boss at the time, Vic Cotroni remarked, "Me, I'm capodecina. I got the right to expel." Violi requested permission from the New York bosses to kill Rizzuto, but the request was turned down.

In 1974, Violi and Cotroni were overheard on a police wiretap threatening to kill Hamilton mobster Johnny Papalia and demanding $150,000 after he used their names in a $300,000 extortion plot without notifying or cutting them in on the score. The three were convicted of extortion in 1975 and sentenced to six years in prison. Violi and Cotroni appealed and got their sentences reduced to six months, but Papalia's appeal was rejected. The following year, Violi was arrested to stand before the Quebec government's Commission d'enquête sur le crime organisé (CECO) inquiry into organized crime; he was sent to jail for one year for contempt.

The testimony heard during the CECO hearings proved damaging to Violi's reputation. One Montreal businessman, Mauro Marchettini, testified that Violi's younger brother, Francesco Violi, threatened his life for opening a poolroom close to the Reggio Bar owned by Violi as Francesco warned that his brother did not want competition. Marchettini testified that he went to a meeting with Francesco who instead of talking "...began slapping me in the face. He did it in a very calm way, without too much force. All the while he was giving me advice about how I shouldn't open there. Then he started hitting me on the shoulders with a four-foot-long stick used to mix ice cream. And he kicked me in the face. I was bleeding from the mouth and I had a broken tooth and both eyes were blackened." Marchettini ended up selling his poolroom to a Violi associate who promptly shut it down. Another Italian immigrant businessman testified behind a mask at the CECO hearings as he wished to remain anonymous that he was forced at gunpoint to go to the basement of the Reggio Bar to see Violi. He testified, "I was suffering. We were making sacrifices, my wife more than I. Sometimes there were days when we had nothing to eat. I didn't want to sign them [the protection money cheques]. Paolo had a cigar in his mouth. He told me: 'Sign!'. I cried like a child. I had worked on my business for fifteen years and they ate it all." The businessman stated that the protection money payments ruined his business and faced him into bankruptcy.

One of Violi's "soldiers", Peter Bianco, who had turned Crown's evidence, testified against his former boss at the CECHO hearings. Bianco testified that his area of expertise was robbing wedding presents, saying, "We mostly did Italian weddings. We cleaned out the house while the people were at church." Bianco's testimony was supported by a wiretapped phone call where Violi called him and his partner, Tony Teoli, "a pair of no-goods" who had only stolen "nothing but cheap stuff." Another piece of evidence introduced during the CEHO hearings was a bugged phone call Violi had made to Cotroni in 1973 where, amid much laughter, he cheerfully confessed to attempted murder as he told his boss, "I shot the asshole three times. The papers didn't say so, but I'm telling you it was me, with another soldier, who went into the apartment. He was sleeping and boom, boom, I shot him three times." Violi's only regret was that he failed to kill the man, but he took consolation from the fact that "They say he's still got two [bullets in the head] and they can't get them out. But he'll remain crippled...It's worse than being dead." Violi then went on to complain at length that his 9mm handgun was not large enough for his tastes and he wanted a .22-calibre handgun for the next time that he shot someone. Violi was a braggart who claimed to Cotroni that he committed crimes done by others and the police knew that this particular attempted murder was the work of someone else. The wiretap put Violi into the dilemma of having to confess to attempted murder or having to confess that he lied to his boss (a serious offense under the Mafia code); Violi chose the former during his testimony as he maintained that he really did shoot the man.

A recording made by Menard on 5 December 1973 showed that Violi was confident that his office was not bugged and he mocked the CECO inquiry, saying in a contemptuous tone, "They're running around, butting in, and their balls are in an uproar because they don't know anything." As the recordings were played in the inquiry room, Violi sat looking glum and stunned. During his own testimony, Violi portrayed himself as a victim and refused to answer any of the questions from the commissioners in a substantial manner. When convicted of contempt, Violi said, "I don't refuse to testify, but I have absolutely nothing to say to this court." The CEHO hearings destroyed Violi's reputation and paved the way for his murder. The way that the police wiretaps revealed that Violi kept boasting with hubristic arrogance that it was not possible for the police to wiretap him made him appear to be a fool. Likewise, the way that the police wiretaps showed him making disparaging and insulting remarks about his superiors in Montreal and New York were gravely damaging to his reputation. Peter Edwards, the crime correspondent of The Toronto Star wrote, "The wiretap conversations had shown that Violi didn't measure up to the traditional Mafia standards of leadership. He was clearly a braggart and was indiscreet. Perhaps, worse of all, he showed himself to be a petty criminal who didn't balk at having his soldiers steal from Little Italy brides as he attended their weddings, a man whose actions deprived St. Leonard children of gifts at Christmas."

Mob war and death
In 1977, Rizzuto and Violi met face-to-face in the home of a Montreal resident for a last-ditch effort to resolve their differences, according to a police report. But the peace talks failed, and most of the Rizzuto family fled to Venezuela.

This led to a power struggle mob war in Montreal which began with the murder of Violi's consigliere Pietro Sciara on Valentine's Day in 1976; Sciara's body was left in the street after seeing an Italian-dubbed version of The Godfather Part II with his wife. Just under a year later, on 8 February 1977, Francesco Violi, the younger brother of Paolo, the family enforcer, was murdered by several shotgun wounds. Shortly after Violi was released from the brief jail sentence with relation to the CECO inquiry, he sold his bar to brothers Vincenzo and Giuseppe Randisi; the name was changed to Bar Jean-Talon. Just under a year after Francesco Violi's murder, on 22 January 1978, Paolo Violi was shot in the head at close range with a lupara in the Bar Jean-Talon after being invited to play cards by Vincenzo Randisi. As Violi sat playing cards, two men wearing ski masks stormed in while one shouted "everybody to the floor!" while the other one raced up to Violi to shoot him dead from behind at very close range with a sawed-off .12 gauge shotgun. The first shot, which blasted off much of Violi's head, killed him instantly but the killer fired a second shot at his corpse just to complete his work of destroying his head in a symbolic show of disrespect. 

Violi's funeral was five days later at the Church of the Madonna della Difesa, and was buried at Notre Dame des Neiges Cemetery in Montreal. In a sign of disfavour, only a few gangsters attended the funeral. Violi's father-in-law, Giacomo Luppino of Hamilton together with Michele "Mike" Racco of Toronto and Frank Sylvestro of Guelph were the only non-Montreal Mafiosi to make the trip to Montreal to attend Violi's funeral. No Mafiosi from New York attended the funeral, though Carmine Galante sent a funeral wreath. Vic Cotroni attended the funeral, but refused to speak to Violi's grieving family. Edwards wrote about Cotroni's role in the murder that he "...gave his grudging approval, knowing a refusal might add his name to the assassins' hit list. Vic Cotroni was not one to buck New York and any hit on Violi had to be sanctioned from the United States."

Aftermath
Although Nicolò Rizzuto was in Venezuela at the time of Violi's murder, his brother-in-law Domenico Manno was believed to play a major role in the murder under Rizzuto's orders. The three hitmen who killed Violi, namely Agostino Cuntrera, Giovanni DiMora, and Domenico Manno all made guilty pleas to the charges of conspiracy to murder Violi as the Crown dropped the charges of first-degree murder against them as part of the plea bargain. Cuntrera, Manno and DiMora observed omertà and refused to name who hired them, but the police had observed that the three men often talked with Nicolo Rizzuto. The Montreal Gazette in an editorial condemned the plea bargains where it was declared, "For society to let people off with punishment this light-under a seven year term, a prisoner is eligible for parole after two-is almost to sanction the planning of executions...All this adult life, Paolo Violi worked to undermine respect for the law. Now, even in death, it would appear that he has accomplished the same."

Manno received a seven-year sentence after pleading guilty to conspiring to kill Violi. Rizzuto confidant Agostino Cuntrera was also prosecuted, receiving a five-year sentence in relation to Violi's murder. The war ended on 17 October 1980, when Rocco Violi, the last of Violi's brothers, was seated, for a family meal, at his kitchen table in his Montreal home when a single bullet from a sniper's rifle struck him dead. Cotroni died of cancer on 16 September 1984. By the mid 1980s, the Rizzuto crime family emerged as Montreal's pre-eminent crime family after the turf war.

After Paolo Violi's death, his widow and two sons, Domenico (Dom) and Giuseppe (Joe) moved to Hamilton, an area controlled by the Buffalo crime family and 'Ndrangheta families. A 2002 Halton Police report suggested the Violi brothers were affiliated with the Luppino-Violi crime family in Hamilton started by their grandfather Giacomo Luppino. Domenico Violi subsequently became the underboss of the Buffalo crime family in 2017; the first Canadian to hold the second-highest position in the American Mafia.

Books

References

1931 births
1978 deaths
1978 murders in Canada
20th-century Canadian criminals
Canadian male criminals
Canadian gangsters of Italian descent
Italian gangsters
Murdered Canadian gangsters
Murdered Mafiosi
Italian emigrants to Canada
Criminals from Montreal
Cotroni crime family
People from the Province of Reggio Calabria
Organized crime in Montreal
Italian people murdered abroad
People acquitted of manslaughter
Naturalized citizens of Canada
Burials at Notre Dame des Neiges Cemetery
Deaths by firearm in Quebec
People murdered by Canadian organized crime
Canadian prisoners and detainees
Prisoners and detainees of Canada
1978 in Quebec
Extortionists